William Wilson (born ) is an English rugby union and rugby sevens player. He currently plays rugby union for South African Currie Cup side , on loan from English Premiership side . His regular position is loose forward.

In 2018, Wilson represented the England Sevens team at the 2018 Hong Kong Sevens tournament.

References

English rugby union players
Living people
1997 births
Rugby union flankers
Rugby union number eights
Griquas (rugby union) players
England international rugby sevens players
South Africa Under-20 international rugby union players